Guo Tianyu (born 5 March 1999) is a Chinese professional footballer who plays as a forward for Chinese Super League club Shandong Taishan.

Club career
Guo Tianyu joined Chinese Super League side Shandong Luneng Taishan's (now renamed Shandong Taishan) youth academy in May 2011. He was promoted to the first team squad by Mano Menezes in 2016. He made his senior debut in the fourth round of 2016 Chinese FA Cup on 29 June 2016 with a 1–0 away defeat against Shanghai Shenhua, coming on as a substitution for Wu Xinghan in the 83rd minute. On 4 March 2017, he made his league debut in a 2–0 home win against Tianjin Teda, coming on for Wang Tong in the stoppage time.

In February 2019, Guo was loaned to Super League newcomer Wuhan Zall for the 2019 season. He would make his debut for them in a league game against Beijing Sinobo Guoan F.C. on 1 March 2019 that ended in a 1-0 defeat. He would return to Shandong the following season and go on to score his first goal for the club in a league game on 9 August 2020 against Guangzhou Evergrande Taobao F.C. where he scored the winning goal in a 1-0 victory. He would go on to establish himself as a regular within the team and was part of the squad that won the 2020 Chinese FA Cup against Jiangsu Suning F.C. in a 2-0 victory. He scored 10 goals in the 2021 Chinese Super League season, became an integral part of the Taishan team that won the Chinese Super League and Chinese FA Cup domestic double, their first league title in 11 years. 

On 27 January 2022, Guo was loaned to Primeira Liga club Vizela until 30 June 2022. He made 3 league appearances during his time in Portugal, before returning to Taishan's first team squad in August 2022. On his return he would establish himself as a regular member of the team once more and added the 2022 Chinese FA Cup towards his trophy collection with them.

Career statistics 
Statistics accurate as of match played 31 January 2023.

Honours

Club
Shandong Luneng/ Shandong Taishan
Chinese Super League: 2021.
Chinese FA Cup: 2020, 2021, 2022.

References

External links
 

1999 births
Living people
Chinese footballers
Footballers from Shandong
Sportspeople from Jinan
Shandong Taishan F.C. players
Wuhan F.C. players
F.C. Vizela players
Chinese Super League players
Primeira Liga players
Chinese expatriate footballers
Expatriate footballers in Portugal
Chinese expatriate sportspeople in Portugal
Association football forwards
China under-20 international footballers
21st-century Chinese people